{{Infobox AFL biography
| name = Barry Cable
| image = 
| fullname = Barry Thomas Cable
| birth_date = 
| birth_place = Narrogin, Western Australia
| death_date = 
| death_place = 
| originalteam = Narrogin Imperials (UGSFL)
| height = 168 cm
| weight = 70 kg
| position = Rover
| years1 = 1962–1969, 1971–1973
| club1 = 
| games_goals1 = 225 (327)
| years2 = 1970, 1974–1977
| club2 = 
| games_goals2 = 115 (133)
| years3 = 1978–1979
| club3 = 
| games_goals3 = 39 (48)
| games_goalstotal = 379 (508)
| sooyears1 = 1964–1978
| sooteam1 = Western Australia
| soogames_goals1 = 20 (35)
| sooyears2 = 1975
| sooteam2 = Victoria
| soogames_goals2 = 1 (0)
| soogames_goalstotal = 21 (35)
| coachclub1 = 
| coachyears1 = 1972–1973
| coachgames_wins1 = 44 (19–25–0)
| coachclub2 = 
| coachyears2 = 1978–1980
| coachgames_wins2 = 68 (39–29–0)
| coachclub3 = 
| coachyears3 = 1981–1984
| coachgames_wins3 = 76 (40–36–0)
| statsend = 1979
| coachstatsend = 1984
| repstatsend = 1978
| careerhighlights = Club
2x VFL Premiership player: (1975, 1977)
4x WANFL Premiership player: (1966, 1967, 1968, 1978)
3x Sandover Medal: (1964, 1968, 1973)
 Syd Barker Medal: (1970)
7x Perth Best and Fairest: 1965-1969, 1971, 1973
3x Simpson Medal: 1966-1968 
  Captain: 1972-1973
 North Melbourne Team of the Century (Rover)

Representative
 Tassie Medal: 1966
2x All-Australian team: (1966, 1969)
2x Simpson Medal: (1969, 1977)

Overall
 Sport Australia Hall of Fame 
 Australian Football Hall of Fame, inducted 1996, Legend status 2012
 West Australian Football Hall of Fame - Legend Status
 Indigenous Team of the Century (Rover and Coach)Coaching National Football Carnival Championship: 1979
 All-Australian team: 1979
 WAFL Premiership: 1978
}}Barry Thomas Cable''' MBE (born 22 September 1943) is a former Australian rules footballer and coach. Considered one of the greatest rovers in the sport's history, he played in 379 premiership games in the Western Australian Football League (WAFL) and the Victorian Football League (VFL), and later coached in both competitions.

Born in Narrogin, Western Australia, Cable made his debut with the Perth Football Club in the WANFL in 1962, and won the Sandover Medal as the fairest and best player in the competition in 1964. Cable was awarded the Tassie Medal as the best player at the 1966 Australian National Football Carnival, as well as selection in the All-Australian team. The same year, he played in the first of three consecutive premierships with Perth, winning the Simpson Medal as the best player in the Grand Final in each year, as well as a further Sandover Medal in 1968. 

Cable left Perth at the end of the 1969 season to play for the North Melbourne Football Club in the VFL, and won the club's best and fairest award, the Syd Barker Medal, before returning to Western Australia at the end of the season. Following another three years at Perth, in which he captain-coached the club in 1972 and 1973 and won his third Sandover Medal in the latter year, Cable returned to North Melbourne for the 1974 season. In another four years at the club, he played in two premierships, in 1975 and 1977, before again returning to Perth after accepting an offer to captain-coach . Cable retired from playing at the end of the 1979 season, having injured himself in a farming accident.

Cable returned to Victoria in 1981 to become the senior coach of North Melbourne, a role which he held until 1984, and later worked as an assistant at the West Coast Eagles during their first years in the VFL. Having represented Western Australia in a total of 20 matches during his playing career, Cable also coached the team at the 1979 State of Origin Carnival, later being named coach of the All-Australian team. 

Cable holds "Legend" status in both the Australian Football Hall of Fame and the West Australian Football Hall of Fame, as well as membership in the Sport Australia Hall of Fame. His tally of seven best and fairest awards at Perth is a club record, while his career total of 379 premiership matches is a record for any elite Australian rules football player born in Western Australia as of 2022, and was also an elite Australian rules football record until broken by Kevin Bartlett in Round 20 of the 1982 VFL season.

Cable also played three pre-season/night series matches for East Perth and 21 interstate football matches (20 for Western Australia and one for Victoria), along with one pre-season/night series match for North Melbourne (these are recognised as senior by the WAFL but not the VFL/AFL). If these are included, then Cable played a total of 404 senior career games, which is also the most (equal with Brian Peake) of any elite Australian rules football player born in Western Australia.

The VFL/AFL list Cable and Peake's total as 403, excluding their VFL/AFL pre-season/night series match (Cable for North Melbourne and Peake for Geelong).

Early life
The youngest of eleven children, Cable was born in Narrogin, a country town in the Wheatbelt region of Western Australia. His father, Edward, born in England, died when Cable was six and he was raised by his indigenous mother, Dorothy a member of the Noongar people of south-west Western Australia. Cable spent much of his childhood playing football – aged eleven, he was reprimanded by his school headmaster for devoting too much time to playing. Cable debuted for the senior side of his local club, the Narrogin Imperials in the Upper Great Southern Football League (UGSFL), at the age of fifteen. After spending two years as a butcher's apprentice, Cable moved to Perth to attempt to play in the Western Australian Football League (WAFL).

Playing career
He began his career as a wingman, but late in 1963 was moved to his familiar position of rover. In his first full season there, 1964, Cable would win the first of three Sandover Medals, the highest individual honour in the WAFL. Cable was awarded the Tassie Medal as the best player at the 1966 Australian National Football Carnival, as well as selection in the All-Australian team. The same year, he played in the first of three consecutive premierships with Perth, winning the Simpson Medal as the best player in all three grand finals, as well as a further Sandover Medal in 1968.

North Melbourne (1970)
Cable's first coach at Perth was former  premiership captain Ern Henfry, who alerted the Blues about the talented young rover. So in 1964, Carlton invited Cable to Melbourne and signed him on a "Form Four", which meant that for the next two seasons he was tied to Carlton if he were to play in Victoria. But Cable had no desire to move interstate, despite the repeated urging from Carlton. During the following three seasons, Perth president Cliff Houghton forbade Cable from negotiating with VFL clubs, and when on 6 July 1969 this ban was lifted and Cable spoke with  he did not decide to move. It was not until  secretary Ron Joseph flew over to Perth and met with Cable personally in 1969 that Cable decided to play in Victoria. In August of that year, Cable signed a form four with the North Melbourne Football Club, enabling him to transfer to the Victorian Football League (VFL). The secretary of North Melbourne, Ron Joseph, said Cable was "genuinely interested in playing League football", and wanted to "prove himself in Victorian football". At the time Cable made his initial move to Victoria,  were a struggling team, still a few years away from becoming one of the powerhouses of the decade. 1970 was a miserable year for the Kangaroos as they finished last on the ladder, but Cable justified the hype over his reputation by winning the Syd Barker Medal and finishing fourth in the Brownlow Medal vote count. However, North Melbourne were unable to meet a clause in his contract, which required them to pay Perth $71,000 to retain Cable's services. This was a large sum, especially in the days when being a VFL footballer was not a full-time profession as it would become in later decades. As a result, Cable returned to Western Australia.

Perth Football Club (1971–1973)
Back at Perth, Cable captain-coached the Perth Football Club in in 1972 and 1973 and won his third Sandover Medal in the latter year.

Return to North Melbourne (1974–1977)
During his absence, North Melbourne had managed to sign former Carlton premiership coach Ron Barassi and took advantage of the short-lived Ten-Year Rule to land the signatures of VFL stars Doug Wade, John Rantall and Barry Davis. With Keith Greig and David Dench starting to emerge as champions, Cable decided to return to North Melbourne for the 1974 VFL season. Finally, in 1975, the Kangaroos broke through by defeating  to claim their first VFL premiership. At the conclusion of the 1975 season, Cable considered returning to Perth to play, after the death of his father-in-law. North Melbourne had agreed to release him from his contract, but he decided to remain with the club for at least one more season.

East Perth
He again returned to Perth after accepting an offer to captain-coach . He would return to Perth after 1977.

In the 1978 WAFL grand final, East Perth defeated Cable's old club, Perth, by two points, winning their first premiership since 1972. Cable, who was "at his best in the heavy conditions", was playing in his sixth consecutive grand final, having played in five at North Melbourne.

Having represented Western Australia in 20 matches during his playing career, Cable also coached the team at the 1979 State of Origin Carnival, later being named coach of the All-Australian team.

Coaching career
Cable had significantly less success in the VFL as a non-playing coach than as a player, although he did get North Melbourne into the finals in two of his three full seasons in charge as senior coach during the early 1980s. In 1983, he coached the team to be minor premiers, but North Melbourne lost both final matches to an early exit. After crashing to second-last in 1984 and only avoiding the wooden spoon on percentage, Cable announced his resignation as senior coach in Melbourne, declaring his long-term future lay in Western Australia.

From 1987 to 1989 Cable served as assistant coach with AFL club West Coast Eagles.

Life after football and honours
Shane also played a single game for the West Coast Eagles in 1989.

Cable was made a Member of the Order of the British Empire in December 1978 for "services to Australian rules football",

While playing for East Perth, Cable decided to take up farming as a hobby and purchased a rural property in Orange Grove, on the outskirts of Perth. On 25 October 1979, he was involved in a near-fatal accident on his property when he attempted to start a Massey Ferguson tractor, but lost control of the vehicle, getting his right leg caught under the rear wheel, stripping one side to the bone. Cable was saved when the tractor came off the leg, continued on its path and drove up the wall, cutting off its petrol supply. Cable then had to summon all his inner strength to remain conscious while yelling for help. Fortunately, a neighbour heard his yelling and after rushing to the scene, Cable directed his horrified rescuer to call his wife and the ambulance.

Cable was rushed to the Royal Perth Hospital for emergency treatment. In his first few days, he amazed everyone with his courage, even holding a brief press conference at the hospital the day after the accident. The first operation was a four-hour procedure in which doctors removed large amounts of foreign matter, including petrol, from the wound. Later, secondary infections set in, necessitating the use of heavy painkillers, with Cable said to be "hovering between life and death", and spending his time in a "twilight world of delirium, drugged sleep and excruciating pain". After his condition had stabilised, a series of operations was conducted in which muscle from his right hip was grafted to replace his right calf muscle, with a vein from his lower left leg being made into an artery for his right leg. At one stage, Cable was given the possibility of never walking freely again. 
In all, Cable would spend four months on his back at the hospital for treatment on the right leg. Amazingly, he continued on as coach of East Perth for the 1980 season whilst undergoing extensive rehabilitation.

He was inducted into the Sport Australia Hall of Fame in December 1986. In 1996, he was an inaugural inductee into the Australian Football Hall of Fame, and, in June 2012, was upgraded to "Legend" status. Cable was similarly included as a "Legend" in the West Australian Football Hall of Fame's inaugural induction in 2004. Cable established a non-profit organisation, the Community Development Foundation, in 1999, aimed at assisting schoolchildren from lower socio-economic areas. A function room at Subiaco Oval, the Barry Cable Room, was named in Cable's honour.

In 1997, Hendy Cowan, the Western Australian Minister for Commerce at the time, appointed Cable to the position of the newly formed Aboriginal Economic Development Council, designed to facilitate the "development of Government policy and programs to expand economic opportunities for Aboriginal people". Cable has also been involved in a number of charity efforts involving cycling, especially long-distance cycling. In 1993, he rode a bicycle across the Nullarbor Plain to toss the coin at the 1993 AFL Grand Final, and in April 1997, he led a ride from Mandurah to Bunbury to promote a road safety campaign.

In July 2007, Cable was retrospectively awarded a Simpson Medal for his efforts in the inaugural State of Origin match in 1977, bringing his total number of Simpson Medals to a record five.

Sexual abuse allegations 
In 2019, a woman began legal action against Cable, alleging he sexually abused her between 1968–1973 when she was in her early to late teens. The allegations were investigated by the police in 1998 but no charges were laid. Cable denied the allegations and tried unsuccessfully to have the case thrown out of court several times. Cable's identity was only revealed after a suppression order was lifted in February 2023 ahead of a trial. 

Also in February 2023, a second woman came forward claiming she was sexually abused multiple times by Cable. Cable has categorically denied all the allegations. A third woman came forward as well, accusing Cable of sexually abusing her when she was a child. The woman claims that she refrained from reporting Cable to the police because "all of Australia loved him." During the trial, an additional two women testified that Cable sexually assaulted them when they were children. This takes the women that have accused Cable of sexual abuse to five.

References

Bibliography

External links
 
 
 
 Barry Cable's profile on kangaroos.com.au
 AFL Hall of Fame
Barry Cable player profile page at WAFL FootyFacts

1943 births
Living people
Australian people of English descent
All-Australian coaches
All-Australians (1953–1988)
Australian Football Hall of Fame inductees
Australian rules footballers from Western Australia
East Perth Football Club coaches
East Perth Football Club players
Indigenous Australian players of Australian rules football
Members of the Order of the British Empire
North Melbourne Football Club coaches
North Melbourne Football Club players
North Melbourne Football Club Premiership players
People from Narrogin, Western Australia
Perth Football Club coaches
Perth Football Club players
Sandover Medal winners
Sport Australia Hall of Fame inductees
Syd Barker Medal winners
West Australian Football Hall of Fame inductees
Western Australian State of Origin players
Noongar people
Two-time VFL/AFL Premiership players